Lawrence X. Pusateri (May 25, 1931 – November 24, 2005) was an American politician, lawyer, and judge.

Born in Oak Park, Illinois, Pusateri graduated from DePaul University College of Law. From 1954 to 1957, Pusateri served in the United States Army and was a judge advocate. From 1965 to 1969, Pusateri served in the Illinois House of Representatives and was a Republican. He served as president of the Illinois State Bar Association and then ran for a seat on the Illinois Supreme Court and lost the election. He also served on the Illinois Pardon and Parole Board and the Illinois Judicial Inquiry Board. In 1977, Pusateri was appointed to the Illinois Appellate Court. Pusateri died from cancer of the colon at his home in Chicago, Illinois.

Notes

External links

1931 births
2005 deaths
People from Oak Park, Illinois
Military personnel from Illinois
DePaul University College of Law alumni
United States Army Judge Advocate General's Corps
Judges of the Illinois Appellate Court
Republican Party members of the Illinois House of Representatives
Deaths from cancer in Illinois
20th-century American politicians
20th-century American judges